The striped grunter (Hephaestus obtusifrons) is a species of freshwater ray-finned fish, a grunter from the family Terapontidae. It is found only in the Bewani Mountains in the headwaters of the Pual River system in Papua New Guinea and the upper Sermowai River, Western new Guinea,  Indonesia. It is found in high altitude, fast flowing mountains streams. The males guard and fan the eggs.

References

Hephaestus (fish)
Freshwater fish of Papua New Guinea
Freshwater fish of Western New Guinea
Taxonomy articles created by Polbot
Fish described in 1977